Rockabill Lighthouse is an active 19th century lighthouse, on the larger of the two islands that form Rockabill. It is operated and maintained by the Commissioners of Irish Lights.

History
In 1837 the Drogheda Harbour Commissioners proposed that a lighthouse be built on Rockabill, with the costs to be paid by tolls on the shipping using Drogheda harbour.  In 1838, Trinity House, which was then in charge of lights in Ireland, declined the request.  In 1853 however the Trinity Board reversed its decision and authorized the construction of the lighthouse.  Construction began in 1855 under the supervision of  the Burgess brothers, William and James, who were builders from Limerick.  The lighthouse tower was built 1855–1860 of  granite from the Mourne Mountains in County Down and local limestone from Milverton. The total cost of all buildings and equipment was £13,248. The light was placed into operation on 1 July 1860.

The light tower is painted white with one broad black horizontal band. In 1918, the station was also equipped with a fog horn, which gives four blasts every minute. A keeper's residence and other buildings are located at the station, which is operated by the Commissioners of Irish Lights. The lighthouse was automated in March 1989.

See also

 List of lighthouses in Ireland

References

External links

Commissioners of Irish Lights

Lighthouses completed in 1860
Lighthouses in the Republic of Ireland